Wittmackia neoregelioides is a species of flowering plant in the family Bromeliaceae, endemic to Brazil (the state of Bahia). It was first described in 1999 as Ronnbergia neoregelioides.

References

Bromelioideae
Flora of Brazil
Plants described in 1999